Jan Jansen may refer to:

Jan Jansen (cyclist) (born 1945), Dutch cyclist
Jan Jansen (historian) (born 1962), Dutch historian
Jan B. Jansen (1898–1984), Norwegian professor of medicine
Jan K. S. Jansen (1931–2011), Norwegian professor of medicine
Jan Helge Jansen (born 1937), Norwegian politician
Jan Jansen, a Baldur's Gate character

See also
Jan Jansohn, guitarist
"Yon Yonson", a children's rhyme
Jan Janszoon (c. 1570–1641), Dutch pirate
Jan Janssen (disambiguation)
Jan Jansson (disambiguation)